Leslie Ray Adams (born June 18, 1974) is an American politician from Virginia. A member of the Republican Party, Adams is the member of the Virginia House of Delegates for the 16th district, succeeding Don Merricks.

Electoral history

References

External links

 Biography at Ballotpedia

Living people
Republican Party members of the Virginia House of Delegates
Place of birth missing (living people)
1974 births
21st-century American politicians
People from Montgomery County, Virginia
People from Chatham, Virginia
Liberty University alumni
University of Richmond School of Law alumni